Minto may refer to:

Places

Antarctica
Mount Minto (Antarctica)

Australia
Minto, New South Wales, a suburb of Sydney
 Minto railway station
 Minto County, Western Australia
 Parish of Minto, New South Wales

Canada
 Minto City, British Columbia
 Minto, Manitoba
 Minto (electoral district), in the City of Winnipeg
 Rural Municipality of Minto, Manitoba
 Rural Municipality of Minto-Odanah, Manitoba
 Minto, New Brunswick
 Minto, Ontario, a town
 Minto, Yukon
 Minto Aerodrome, in Yukon
 Minto Inlet, Northwest Territories
 Minto Islands, Nunavut
 Minto (lava flow), Yukon
 Lake Minto, Nunavik, Quebec
 Mount Minto, British Columbia
 Mount Minto (Nunavut)

United Kingdom
Minto, Scottish Borders, Scotland

United States
Minto, Alaska
Minto, North Dakota, a city
 Minto School

Parks 

 Minto Park (downtown Ottawa, Ontario, Canada.)
 Minto Park, Allahabad, Later renamed Madan Mohan Malaviya Park after independence of India
 Minto Park, Lahore   later renamed Greater Iqbal Park after creation of  Pakistan

People
 Earl of Minto, a title in the peerage of the United Kingdom
 Abid Hassan Minto (born 1932), Pakistani lawyer and politician
 Brian Minto (born 1975), American boxer
 Dorothy Minto (1886–1957), British actor
 Francesco Minto (born 1987), Italian rugby player
 Harry Minto (1864–1915), American prison officer killed in the line of duty, son of John Minto the Oregon pioneer
 Jenni Minto (born 1968), Scottish politician
 John Minto (born c.1953), New Zealand political activist
 John Minto (British politician) (1887 – c.1963)
 John Minto (Oregon pioneer) (1822–1915)
 Lee Minto (born 1927), American women's health activist
 Les Minto (1886–1955), Australian rules footballer
 Matt Minto (born 1990), Australian rugby league footballer
 Scott Minto (born 1971), English footballer
 Scott Minto (rugby league) (born 1978), Australian rugby league footballer
 Wallace L. Minto (1921–1983), inventor of the Minto wheel
 William Minto (1845–1893), Scottish author

Other uses
 , an icebreaker
 MINTO (Mixed Integer Optimizer), an integer programming solver 
 Minto (sternwheeler), a lake steamer in British Columbia, Canada
 Minto Eye Hospital, in Bangalore, India
 Minto Group, a Canadian real estate company
 Minto Sailing Dinghy, a 9-foot sailing dinghy

See also

 Mentos, mint flavored candies
 Prince Albert Mintos, a Canadian ice hockey team 
 Dickson Minto, a Scottish law firm